Metafour is the second studio album by Slaves on Dope, released on June 10, 2003.

The album was released by Bieler Bros. Records, with major label distribution in MCA Records. In contrast to their debut release, Metafour displays little of the screaming, shouting, and angst of its predecessor.

Track listing
 "Go" – 2:58
 "September" – 3:55
 "Pattern" – 3:44
 "So Clear" – 3:41
 "Poster Boy" – 3:38
 "Caffeine Love Affair" – 3:53
 "Columbian Ascot" – 3:06
 "Casualty of Me" – 4:17
 "Glass Friend" – 4:03
 "Drain Me" – 3:02
 "The Plan" – 3:12
 "Drag Down" – 3:04
 "Only Hero" – 3:25
 "Nothing" – 8:45

Personnel
 Jason Slater - Producer
 Troy Van Leeuwen - Producer
 Slaves on Dope - Producer
 Keith Rose - Engineer, Mixing (except "Go")
 Jason Bieler - Mixing (except "Go"), A&R
 Scrap 60 Productions - Mixing (only "Go")
 Mike Fuller - Mastering
 Aaron Bieler - A&R

2003 albums
Slaves on Dope albums
Bieler Bros. Records albums
Albums produced by Jason Slater